Mark Spiro (born March 28, 1957) is an American songwriter, record producer and recording artist.

Represented on millions of records sold worldwide, Spiro has delivered songs to artists such as Julian Lennon, Cheap Trick, John Waite, Heart, Laura Branigan,  Bad English, Lita Ford, and Giant.  He has also released solo material sporadically.

Career
Originally from Seattle, Spiro relocated to Los Angeles to pursue a career within the music industry in his early 20s. While in L.A., he met German record producer/label owner Jack White, after which he spent several years in Germany working as a singer, songwriter, and producer (Laura Branigan, Anne Murray, Engelbert Humperdinck, Pia Zadora, Hazell Dean, David Hasselhoff).

Upon Spiro's return to Los Angeles in the mid-1980s, he began building a reputation as a successful songwriter with his first major cut on the Top Gun soundtrack and has continued to write songs and produce for other artists.

Spiro was one of the first recording artists to be signed by Interscope Records/Jimmy Iovine. Scheduling conflicts/politics resulted in Spiro leaving Interscope Records. He later recorded Care of My Soul, a solo album released in Australia, Scandinavia, and Japan. In September 2012, his brand new Care Of My Soul. Vol. 2 album was released by Sun Hill Production. At the same time an extended version of the Care Of My Soul Vol. 1 album was released. Both CD albums are available in digipack packaging with 8-12 page booklets as well as found on all digital platforms and formats. In late 2012 Spiro co-wrote and produced the duet "Someday" with Julian Lennon and Steven Tyler.

Spiro also produced for his daughters Ruby and Summer Spiro, who recorded for Lyric Street Records as the duo Ruby Summer.

In 2020, Frontiers Records released a compilation called “2+2=5: Best of + Rarities” which features the best of his solo material starting from 1996's “Now Is Then, Then is Now”, until “It’s a Beautiful Life”, which was released in 2012 on the German label AOR Heaven.

Spiro has recently announced a new solo album entitled "Traveling Cowboys" which is released on May 7, 2021, from Frontiers Records. The first single from the album is a duet called "7 Billion People" which features Julian Lennon and guitarist Tim Pierce.

Discography

Solo albums 
 In Stereo (1986, Germany)
 Care Of My Soul (1994, Japan/Australia/Scandinavia)
 Now Is Then, Then Is Now (1996, Europe & Scandinavia)
 Devotion (1998, Europe & Scandinavia)
 The Stuff Dreams Are Made Of (1999, Europe & Scandinavia)
 King of Crows (2003, Europe & Scandinavia)
 Mighty Blue Ocean (2005, Europe & Scandinavia)
 It's a Beautiful Life (January 2012)
 Care Of My Soul Vol. 1 (2012, September 12. (World)
 Care Of My Soul Vol. 2 (2012, September 12. (World)
 Traveling Cowboys (May 2021,World)

Collaborations 
 Steve Perry
 David Lee Roth
 Rick Springfield
 David Cassidy
 Terri Nunn
 Jane Wiedlin
 Julian Lennon

Original music for TV series 
 One Tree Hill - "Darling It Was You"
 Marker - original music for thirteen episodes
 Fame - "Man in the Mirror"
 Tatort - "Winds Of Change" title song for the episode Das Haus im Wald (1985)

Songwriter
 Julian Lennon - "Saltwater," Photograph Smile
 True Romance soundtrack - "In Dreams" by John Waite
 Selena soundtrack - "Only Love" by Selena
 Music from Another Room soundtrack - "Day After Day" by Julian Lennon
 Anne Murray - "Are You Still in Love with Me"
 Lila McCann (Multi-Platinum)
 Bad English - "Forget Me Not," "Heaven Is a 4 Letter Word," "Straight to Your Heart," "Pray for Rain," "Life at the Top"
 John Waite - "In Dreams," "How Did I Get By Without You"
 Giant
 Ruby Summer
 Mike Reno
 Heart - "Cruel Tears"
 Cheap Trick - "Mighty Wings" (Top Gun soundtrack), "Ride the Pony"
 REO Speedwagon - "Half Way"
 Emmanuel
 Luis Miguel
 Luis Angel
 Mr. Big - "Ain't Seen Love Like That," "Not One Night"
 Kansas - "One Man, One Heart"
 Camy Todorow - Kamelia Todorova - "Love is a War"
 Indigo Balboa
Seventh Key - "Broken Home" (originally a Kansas demo from 1986, previously unreleased)

Production credits
In addition to eight of his own records, Spiro has produced records for:

 Lila McCann (Produced 2 Records)
 Mike Reno
 John Berry
 María Conchita Alonso
 Anne Murray (Produced 2 Records)
 McAlyster (Produced 1 Record)
 Ruby Summer (Produced 2 Records)
 Leslie & Kelly (Produced 3 Records)

References

Record producers from California
Songwriters from Washington (state)
Musicians from Seattle
Musicians from Los Angeles
Living people
1957 births
Songwriters from California